In number theory, a positive integer  is said to be an Erdős–Woods number if it has the following property:
there exists a positive integer  such that in the sequence  of consecutive integers, each of the elements has a non-trivial common factor with one of the endpoints.

Examples
The first Erdős–Woods numbers are
16, 22, 34, 36, 46, 56, 64, 66, 70, 76, 78, 86, 88, 92, 94, 96, 100, 106, 112, 116 … .

History
Investigation of such numbers stemmed from the following prior conjecture by Paul Erdős:

Alan R. Woods investigated this question for his 1981 thesis. Woods conjectured that whenever , the interval  always includes a number coprime to both endpoints. The existence of this counterexample shows that 16 is an Erdős–Woods number.

 proved that there are infinitely many Erdős–Woods numbers, and  showed that the set of Erdős–Woods numbers is recursive.

References

External links

Woods number
Integer sequences